Hypsopygia boudinoti is a species of snout moth in the genus Hypsopygia. It was described by Patrice J.A. Leraut in 2006 and is known from Central Africa.

References

Moths described in 2006
Moths of Africa
Pyralini